Fred Rogers (10 July 1918 – 7 August 1998) was a New Zealand cricketer. He played in one first-class match for Wellington in 1941/42.

See also
 List of Wellington representative cricketers

References

External links
 

1918 births
1998 deaths
New Zealand cricketers
Wellington cricketers
Cricketers from New Plymouth